Kessleria petrobiella is a moth of the  family Yponomeutidae. It is found in Austria, Slovenia and Italy.

The length of the forewings is 6.3–8 mm for males and 6.4–7.8 mm for females. The forewings are white. The hindwings are grey. Adults are on wing from the end of May to the beginning of August.

The larvae feed on Saxifraga caesia.

References

Moths described in 1868
Yponomeutidae
Moths of Europe